"I Love You" is a 1983 song by Swiss band Yello from their album You Gotta Say Yes to Another Excess. The song reached number 41 in the United Kingdom and number 16 on the Billboard Dance Club songs chart. The song was also accompanied by a music video which was directed by Dieter Meier. AllMusic's John Bush stated the song has "deep-throated  vocals".

References

External links

Yello songs
1983 songs